Velie Nunatak is a nunatak located 9 nautical miles (17 km) north of Mount Moses in the Hudson Mountains. It was mapped by United States Geological Survey (USGS) from surveys and U.S. Navy air photos, 1960–66, and named by the Advisory Committee on Antarctic Names (US-ACAN) for Edward C. Velie, a meteorologist at Byrd Station, 1967.

Hudson Mountains
Nunataks of Ellsworth Land
Volcanoes of Ellsworth Land